The Zlin Z-26 Trener was a tandem-seat basic training aircraft built by the Czechoslovakian company Moravan. A low-wing monoplane of largely wooden construction, it was developed into a series of all-metal trainers. Several were also produced in aerobatic variants, known as the Akrobat.

The original Z-26 was designed in the 1940s and produced in 1946 to meet a requirement for a basic trainer to replace the Bücker Jungmann and Bestmann. It was a low-wing monoplane of mixed construction, with wooden wings and a welded metal tube fuselage, powered by a single four-cylinder piston engine, the Walter Minor 4-III. It first flew in early 1947, proving superior to the competing Praga 112, and was declared the winner, entering production in 1948.

Later derivatives were also optimised to participate in aerobatic competitions and many were owned by private pilot owners.  Both the two-seat Trener and the single-seat Akrobat were considered highly successful, winning several aerobatic awards in the 1960s.

Variants

The following variants were progressive improvements on the Z-26:
 Z-26 – two-seat primary trainer aircraft. 163 built.
 Z-126 – introduced in 1953, Czech military designation C-105, all-metal wing instead of original wooden wing.
 Z-226 – more powerful Walter Minor 6-III six-cylinder engine, C-205
 Z-226A – single-seat aerobatic aircraft. This and subsequent single-seat variants were named the Akrobat.
 Z-226B – glider tug aircraft
 Z-226T – basic training version
 Z-326 – Introduced in 1959, with an electrically retractable undercarriage (standard on future models)
 Z-526 – with the Walter 6-III carburettor's six-cylinder engine
 Z-526A – single-seat aerobatic aircraft
 Z-526F – Improved version. M-137 engine with fuel injector.
 Z-726 – modified 526 with shortened wings and fuselage
 Z-726K – with Walter M 337 supercharged engine

In 1956, deliveries began of the Z326 Trener-Master and Z326A Akrobat.  Many sub-variants were also produced, for example the Z-526A and Z-526AFS were aerobatic specials. The production of the family was terminated in the 1970s with Z-726.  The Z-726 Universal had reduced wingspan.

Operators

Military operators 
  Austrian Air Force
  Cuban Revolutionary Air and Air Defense Force - received about 60 Z-226, Z-326 and Z-526s in the 1960s.
  Czechoslovakian Air Force
  Air Forces of the National People's Army

Specifications (Z-726)

See also

References

 Frawley, Gerard. The International Directory of Civil Aircraft. Aerospace Publications Pty Ltd, 1997 
 Hagedorn, Daniel P. Central American and Caribbean Air Forces. Tonbridge, Kent, UK: Air-Britain (Historians) Ltd., 1993. .
 Mourik, Dick van. "A to Zlin: An Illustrated History of a Light Aircraft Dynasty". Air Enthusiast, No. 93, May/June 2001. Stamford, UK:Key Publishing. . pp. 59–65.
 Taylor, John W R. (editor). Jane's All The World's Aircraft 1976–77. London: Jane's Yearbooks, 1976. .
 Taylor, Michael J.H. (editor). Jane's Encyclopedia of Aviation. London:Bracken Books, 1989. .

External links

Aerobatic aircraft
1950s Czechoslovakian military trainer aircraft
Zlín aircraft
Single-engined tractor aircraft
Low-wing aircraft
Aircraft first flown in 1947